Acomita Lake is a census-designated place (CDP) in Cibola County, New Mexico, United States. The population was 416 at the 2010 census.

Geography
Acomita Lake is located in northeastern Cibola County at  (35.065931, -107.623511), along the northern edge of the Acoma Indian Reservation. Interstate 40 runs past the northern side of the community, with access from exits 96 and 100. A reservoir named Acomita Lake is in the eastern part of the community, and the Rio San Jose, a tributary of the Rio Puerco, forms the southern edge of the community.

Demographics

As of the census of 2000, there were 312 people, 74 households, and 60 families residing in the CDP. The population density was 91.3 people per square mile (35.2/km). There were 94 housing units at an average density of 27.5 per square mile (10.6/km). The racial makeup of the CDP was 0.64% White, 98.72% Native American, 0.64% from other races. Hispanic or Latino of any race were 2.88% of the population.

There were 74 households, out of which 37.8% had children under the age of 18 living with them, 44.6% were married couples living together, 17.6% had a female householder with no husband present, and 17.6% were non-families. 14.9% of all households were made up of individuals, and 8.1% had someone living alone who was 65 years of age or older. The average household size was 4.22 and the average family size was 4.56.

In the CDP, the population was spread out, with 36.9% under the age of 18, 10.3% from 18 to 24, 28.2% from 25 to 44, 16.0% from 45 to 64, and 8.7% who were 65 years of age or older. The median age was 28 years. For every 100 females, there were 97.5 males. For every 100 females age 18 and over, there were 101.0 males.

The median income for a household in the CDP was $34,750, and the median income for a family was $32,750. Males had a median income of $21,806 versus $17,417 for females. The per capita income for the CDP was $9,076. 17.8% of the population and 11.9% of families were below the poverty line. Out of the total population, 22.8% of those under the age of 18 and 18.2% of those 65 and older were living below the poverty line.

Education 
All public schools in the county are operated by Grants/Cibola County Schools.

Cultural references
Acomita is mentioned in Willa Cather's 1927 novel Death Comes for the Archbishop, Book Three Chapter 1.

See also
Acoma Pueblo
Acoma Indian Reservation

References

Census-designated places in Cibola County, New Mexico
Acoma Pueblo
Census-designated places in New Mexico